Kholtoson (Kholtohon) is a rural locality (a selo) in Zakamensky District, Republic of Buryatia, Russia. The population was 877 as of 2010. There are 15 streets.

Geography 
Kholtoson is located 10 km south of Zakamensk (the district's administrative centre) by road. Khatsura is the nearest rural locality.

References 

Rural localities in Zakamensky District